John H. Hamilton Jr. (February 9, 1919 – August 10, 1986) was a Republican member of the Pennsylvania House of Representatives. He served six consecutive terms and was not a candidate for re-election to the House for a 1979 term.

References

Republican Party members of the Pennsylvania House of Representatives
People from Somers Point, New Jersey
1919 births
1986 deaths
20th-century American politicians